Shankarrao Butte Patil Vidyalaya, formerly New English School, Junnar is one of the oldest and reputed school in the western Maharashtra, in the town of Junnar in Pune district. It was established in 1935 by the Junnar Education Society under the intellectual and academic leadership of the famous educator R.P.Sabnis, a Cambridge University alumni. The institute has the motto "Play the game" and  धर्मं चर (Practise the Virtue) from Taittiriya Upanishad.

Shankarrao Butte Patil Vidyalaya has secondary, higher secondary and English medium school running under its umbrella.

External links

Schools in Pune district